Alaena ferrulineata is a butterfly in the family Lycaenidae. It is found in northern and southern Tanzania. The habitat consists of rocky hillsides in dry thorn country and mountains at altitudes ranging from 1,000 to 2,000 metres.

References

Butterflies described in 1933
Alaena
Endemic fauna of Tanzania
Butterflies of Africa